Candy Raisins are a soft jujube candy popular in Milwaukee, Wisconsin, United States. The candy was produced from the 1930s until 2008, discontinued, then revived in 2014.

Description
Though named "raisin", the name is for the appearance of their wrinkled tops, while the flavor has been compared to: "honey, ginger, lilac, perfume, soap."

History
The candy dates back to the 1930s, when two Milwaukee companies and one San Francisco company were producing them. In 1939, Stark Candy of Milwaukee acquired one of the companies, patented the recipe in 1976, and produced the candy until 2008. Stark was purchased by Necco in 1988, and continued to produce the candy at the Wisconsin plant until its closing in 2008.

In 2014, Delafield entrepreneur John Barker re-introduced Candy Raisins, having invested over $1,000,000 into his Lake Country Candies company and acquiring the rights to the name and recipe from Necco.

See also
 List of candies

References

Further reading
 

Gummi candies
Cuisine of Wisconsin
Companies based in Milwaukee